Tomtor is a rural locality (a selo), the administrative centre of, and one of four settlements in addition to Aeroport, Agayakan and Kuydusun in Sordonnokhsky Rural Okrug of Oymyakonsky District in the Sakha Republic, Russia. Its population as of the 2002 Census was 1,256.

Geography 
Tomtor is located near the left bank of the Kuydusun river, not far from its mouth in the Indigirka.

Climate
Tomtor has a monsoon-influenced extreme subarctic climate (Dwd in the Köppen climate classification).

<div style="width:70%;">

References

Notes

Sources
Official website of the Sakha Republic. Registry of the Administrative-Territorial Divisions of the Sakha Republic. Oymyakonsky District. 

Rural localities in Oymyakonsky District